Drew Thomas Anderson (born June 9, 1981) is an American former professional baseball outfielder. He played with the Milwaukee Brewers in 2006 and in the minor leagues from 2003 to 2010. In late 2010, he was hired by the Brewers as a scout in the Midwestern United States.

Amateur career

High school
Drew attended Kearney High School. He was one of the state's top multi-sport performers at Kearney High School earning first-team All-Nebraska honors for football, track, and baseball. He played American Legion ball, batting .443 as a junior with 41 extra-base hits and 75 RBIs en route to earning all-state tournament honors. In football, he was one of the state's top receivers, earning first-team All-Nebraska honors from the Omaha World-Herald and Lincoln Journal Star in 1999 after hauling in 38 passes for 818 yards and nine touchdowns. On the track, he won the all-class gold medal in both the 110- and 330-meter hurdles, helping the Bearcats win four consecutive state titles.

Nebraska

He went the University of Nebraska to play baseball, appearing in 27 games his freshman year. He batted .293 with nine stolen bases in a minor role for the College World Series bound Huskers.

As a sophomore, Drew went .266 with a homer and 32 RBIs in 63 games including nine multi-hit games. He batted just .077 in 13 postseason at bats, but against Clemson in the 2002 College World Series, he drew a pair of walks and scored a run in Nebraska's near upset of the Tigers.

In his junior year, he batted .238 with 19 RBIs in 57 games.

In the 2003 Major League Baseball draft, he was selected by the Milwaukee Brewers in the 24th round (699th overall). He decided to forgo his senior year to play professionally.

Professional career

2003–2005
Anderson started his professional career in 2003 with the Helena Brewers, batting .318 with two homers, 38 RBIs and nine stolen bases. He was fifth in the rookie Pioneer League in OBP (.420).

He was promoted to the A-ball Beloit Snappers for 2004. He finished eighth in the Midwest League with a .307 batting average. He also had 22 doubles, 59 RBIs and 64 runs in 123 games.

In 2005, Anderson was promoted again playing for the Brevard County Manatees. He played in 129 games with 6 home runs. He led the Florida State League in hits (158), second in at-bats (508), third in batting avg. (.311) and fifth in triples (7). He was promoted for the third consecutive year to AA for the 2006 season.

2006
Anderson played for the Double-A Huntsville Stars for most of the year and the Triple-A Nashville Sounds in 2006, combining to hit .297 with seven homers, 52 RBIs and 20 steals in 124 games. He was brought up to the Brewers as a September call-up and made his Major League debut on September 11, 2006, against the Pittsburgh Pirates. He appeared as a pinch hitter and struck out against Salomón Torres to end the game. On September 21, 2006, in his first start against the San Francisco Giants, he recorded his first Major League hit, a single off Matt Morris. He appeared in 9 games for the Brewers to end the season, batting .111 (1-for-9) with 3 runs scored.

2007–2010
In 2007, he played 108 games for the Nashville Sounds with a .273 average and led the team with 28 doubles and 16 stolen bases. From May 21 to June 2, he also made 12 appearances at Double-A Huntsville. While there, he produced a pair of four-hit games on May 26 and May 30. In 120 games at the two stops, he hit .291 with five homers, 47 RBIs and 17 steals.

On January 15, 2008, Anderson was designated for assignment by the Brewers. He was claimed off waivers by the Cincinnati Reds on January 18. Anderson spent the entire season with their Triple-A affiliate, the Louisville Bats. He went .290 and was second on the team with 404 at bats and 117 hits. From June 4 through June 30, he reached base safely in 30 consecutive games, including a season high 14-game hitting streak in that span.

Drew was released prior to the 2009 season, but was re-signed by the Milwaukee Brewers to a minor league contract and assigned to Double-A Huntsville. Splitting the season between AA Huntsville and AAA Nashville, Anderson batted .294 with a .370 OBP and a career-high in home runs with 10. He filed for free agency following the 2009 season.

On May 3, 2010, he signed with the Milwaukee Brewers and was assigned to Triple-A Nashville. Once again splitting time between Huntsville and Nashville, Drew batted .281 with a .375 OBP and 35 extra base hits in 339 plate appearances. He became a free agent after the season, and has not played professionally since.

Scouting career
After the season, Anderson was hired by the Brewers as a scout in the Midwestern United States. His territory includes Nebraska, Kansas, Minnesota, North Dakota, and South Dakota.

References

External links

Huskers.com Bio

1981 births
Living people
Helena Brewers players
Beloit Snappers players
Brevard County Manatees players
Huntsville Stars players
Nashville Sounds players
Baseball players from Nebraska
People from Kearney, Nebraska
Major League Baseball left fielders
Milwaukee Brewers players
Milwaukee Brewers scouts
Louisville Bats players
Nebraska Cornhuskers baseball players
Anchorage Glacier Pilots players